William St. Aubyn (by 1526 – 1558/1571), of Mawgan in Meneage, Cornwall, was an English politician.

He was a Member (MP) of the Parliament of England for Helston in April 1554 and November 1554, for West Looe in 1555 and for Camelford in 1558.

References

16th-century deaths
English MPs 1554
Politicians from Cornwall
Members of the pre-1707 English Parliament for constituencies in Cornwall
Year of birth uncertain
English MPs 1554–1555
English MPs 1555
English MPs 1558